Dub Calgaid mac Laidcnén (died 769) was a king of the Uí Cheinnselaig of South Leinster. He belonged to the Sil Chormaic sept of this branch of the Laigin and specifically to a branch which took over leadership of the Uí Dróna -the baronies of Idrone in modern County Carlow. His last paternal ancestor to hold the throne was his great great grandfather Crundmáel Erbuilc (died 655) He was the brother of Donngal mac Laidcnén (died 761). He ruled from 761 to 769.

The Uí Cheinnselaig became involved in a period of infighting and in 769 Dub Calgaid was defeated and slain at the Battle of Ferns by his successor Cennselach mac Brain (died 770) of the Sil Máeluidir sept.

Notes

References

 Gearoid Mac Niocaill (1972), Ireland before the Vikings, Dublin: Gill and Macmillan

External links
CELT: Corpus of Electronic Texts at University College Cork

Kings of Leinster
Kings of Uí Cheinnselaig
769 deaths
8th-century Irish monarchs
Monarchs killed in action
People from County Carlow
Year of birth unknown